Rustad is an unincorporated community in Clay County, in the U.S. state of Minnesota.

History
A post office was established as Kurtz in 1891, the name was changed to Rustad in 1907, and the post office closed in 1954. The community was named for Samuel Rustad, an early merchant.

References

Unincorporated communities in Clay County, Minnesota
Unincorporated communities in Minnesota